1,3-Butanediol is an  organic compound with the formula CH3CH(OH)CH2CH2OH.  With two alcohol functional groups, the molecule is classified as a diol. The compound is also chiral but most studies do not distiguigh the enantiomers.  The compound is a colorless, bittersweet, water-soluble liquid.  It is one of four common structural isomers of butanediol. It is used in flavoring.

Production and uses
Hydrogenation of 3-hydroxybutanal gives 1,3-butanediol:
CH3CH(OH)CH2CHO  +  H2  →  CH3CH(OH)CH2CH2OH
Dehydration of 1,3-butanediol gives 1,3-butadiene:
CH3CH(OH)CH2CH2OH  →  CH2=CH-CH=CH2  +  2H2O

Occurrence
1,3-Butanediol is used as a hypoglycaemic agent. 

1,3-Butanediol has been detected in green bell peppers, orange bell peppers, pepper (Capsicum annuum), red bell peppers, and yellow bell peppers. 1,3 Butanediol, also referred to as 1,3-Butylene glycol, maintains FDA GRAS status as a flavor molecule.

References

Alkanediols